The 1946 Oil Bowl was a college football postseason bowl game featuring the Georgia Bulldogs and the Tulsa Golden Hurricane in the first Oil Bowl since 1944.

Background
The Bulldogs had finished 4th in the Southeastern Conference, compounded by losses to LSU and 6th ranked Alabama. This was their third ever bowl game. The Golden Hurricane had finished 2nd in the Missouri Valley Conference, but they were playing in their fifth bowl game of the decade.

Game summary
Charles Smith gave the Bulldogs a 7-0 lead on his 3 yard touchdown run. Tulsa responded with a Camp Wilson touchdown run, but their extra point failed, keeping it 7-6. John
Donaldson caught a 64 yard pass from Charley Trippi to increase the lead. Trippi made the final score 20-6 on his 68 yard punt return, highlighted by him reversing his field and running over two Tulsa players near a sideline.

Aftermath
Frkna would leave for Tulane after the game, and Tulsa did not appear in a bowl game again until 1953. Georgia went to three more bowl games before the decade ended.

Statistics

References

Oil Bowl
Georgia Bulldogs football bowl games
Tulsa Golden Hurricane football bowl games
January 1945 sports events in the United States
Oil Bowl